VOLT-02 is a water-soluble conjugate of progesterone and a neurosteroid which is under development by Levolta Pharmaceuticals (formerly Voltarra Pharmaceuticals) for the treatment of traumatic brain injury, gynecological disorders, and menstrual disorders. As of March 2017, it is in phase II clinical trials for these indications. The chemical structure of VOLT-02 does not appear to have been released yet.

See also
 List of neurosteroids § Inhibitory > Synthetic > Pregnanes
 List of progestogen esters § Oximes of progesterone derivatives
 List of investigational sex-hormonal agents § Progestogenics

References

External links
 Pipeline - Levolta Pharmaceuticals
 Progesterone conjugate (VOLT-02) - Levolta Pharmaceuticals

Drugs with undisclosed chemical structures
Experimental drugs
Neuroprotective agents
Neurosteroids
Pregnanes
Progestogens